The 2010 Duke Blue Devils football team represented Duke University in the 2010 NCAA Division I FBS football season as members of the Atlantic Coast Conference (ACC) in the Coastal Division. The Blue Devils were led by third-year head coach David Cutcliffe and played their home games at Wallace Wade Stadium. Duke finished the season 3–9 overall and 1–7 in ACC play.

Schedule

Personnel

Coaching staff

Roster

Game summaries

Elon

at Wake Forest

No. 1 Alabama

Army

at Maryland

Miami (FL)

at No. 23 Virginia Tech

at Navy

Virginia

Boston College

at Georgia Tech

North Carolina

References

Duke
Duke Blue Devils football seasons
Duke Blue Devils football